CBUF-FM is a Canadian radio station, which broadcasts Radio-Canada's Ici Radio-Canada Première network at 97.7 MHz in Vancouver and on a chain of rebroadcasters around British Columbia. CBUF-FM is a non-commercial public broadcasting station airing news/talk and some music programming.

The station was first launched in 1967 as the first French language Radio-Canada station west of Ontario. Its studios and offices are in the CBC Regional Broadcast Centre on Hamilton Street in Downtown Vancouver, while its transmitter is located atop Mount Seymour.

CBUF also serves as the Première outlet for the Yukon, by way of a locally owned repeater in Whitehorse.

Programming
The station's current local programs are Phare Ouest, in the mornings from 6:00 a.m. to 9 a.m. and Boulevard du Pacifique in the afternoons, 3:30 p.m. to 6 p.m. CBUF-FM also produces the Saturday morning program, Culture et confiture from 7:00 a.m. to 11 a.m. On holidays, CKSB-10-FM produces holiday morning program for western Canada, Les matins de l'Ouest. Le retour de l'Ouest produced by Alberta's CHFA-FM, replaces regional drive programming on Première outlets in western Canada. During summer months, CBUF-FM produces Le monde chez nous a documentary series that is heard on Saturday mornings from 10 a.m. to 11 a.m.

Transmitters

The transmitter in Whitehorse is not owned by the CBC, but is licensed to the Association Franco-Yukonnaise.

References

External links
Ici Radio-Canada Première
 

Buf
Buf
Buf
Radio stations established in 1967
1967 establishments in British Columbia